The High Commission of Sierra Leone in London is the diplomatic mission of Sierra Leone in the United Kingdom.

References

External links
Official site

Sierra Leone
Diplomatic missions of Sierra Leone
Sierra Leone–United Kingdom relations
Buildings and structures in the London Borough of Camden
Holborn